The women's team standard competition at the 2010 Asian Games in Guangzhou was held from 18 November to 26 November at the Guangzhou Chess Institute.

Schedule
All times are China Standard Time (UTC+08:00)

Results
Legend
GP — Game points
SB — Sonneborn–Berger score
WO — Walkover

Preliminary round

Round 1

Round 2

Round 3

Round 4

Round 5

Round 6

Round 7

Summary

Knockout round

Semifinals

Bronze medal match

 Vietnam and India had to go to the sudden death tie break match after both the teams score ended with 2 to 2 at the end of standard time control. The sudden death had to be introduced, which was played on three boards with 6 minutes for white & 5 minutes for black. Vietnam beat India 2–1 to win the Bronze medal.

Gold medal match

References 

Results

Chess at the 2010 Asian Games
Women's chess